This is a list of films in which some or all of the main characters are anthropomorphic insects. It excludes films where the antagonists are inhuman insects or a human becomes an insect, such as The Adventures of André and Wally B., Them! or The Fly. It also excludes documentary, scientific and educational films about insects, such as the Secrets of the Ant and Insect World (1960), More than Honey (2012), and The Strength and Agility of Insects (Percy Smith, 1911).

Animated
Animated films with anthropomorphized insects include:
The Ant Bully (2006) - ants
Maya The Bee Movie (2014) - bees and others
Ants in the Plants (1940) - ants in a Fleischer Color Classics short
Antz (1998) - ants and others 
Bee Movie (2007) - bees and others
James and the Giant Peach (1996) - grasshopper, centipede, spider, others
Billy & Mandy: Wrath of the Spider Queen (2007) - spiders
Bugs in Love (1932) - lovebugs in a Disney Silly Symphonies short
A Bug's Life (1998) - ants and others
The Flea Circus (1954) - fleas
Gallavants (1984) - ants and an amphisbaena
The Grasshopper and the Ants (1934) - another Silly Symphonies entry
A Horse Fly Fleas (1947) - fleas
An Itch in Time (1943) - a flea
Johnny the Giant Killer (1950) - bees, spiders and other species
Katy, Kiki y Koko (1987) - caterpillars, ants and alien molluscs 
Katy la Oruga (1984) - caterpillars, a spider, bees and a butterfly
The Magic Bird (1968) - ants
Minuscule: Valley of the Lost Ants (2013) - ladybugs, ants, a spider, and other species
Minuscule 2: Mandibles from Far Away (2019) - ladybugs, ants, cockroaches, praying mantis, and other species
Mr. Bug Goes to Town (1941) - a grasshopper, bee, and other species
Moth and the Flame (1938) - moths
Pinocchio (1940) - a cricket
Pipi Tobenai Hotaru (1996) - fireflies
The Rescuers (1977) - a dragonfly
Shinbone Alley (1970) - a cockroach
The Spider and the Fly (1931) - flies
Strange Magic (2015) - ants, centipedes and other species

Non-animated
Fly (1970) - an avant-garde 25 minute film directed by John Lennon and Yoko Ono which depicts a housefly crawling around on the body of a nude woman, actress Virginia Lust. By the end of the film, multiple flies can be seen on Lust's body. 
Joe's Apartment (1996) - cockroaches (live action and puppetry blended with computer and stop-motion animation)
The Fly (1986) - Flies (live action and puppetry)
Eega (2012, The Fly) - flies, an Indian fantasy action film written and directed by S. S. Rajamouli

Both
Films and television programmes based on Alice in Wonderland - a caterpillar

See also

Notes and references

Insects
 Films